Ray Roberts Lake State Park is a state park located in Denton County, Texas, near Pilot Point, Texas. It is very popular due to its proximity to the Dallas–Fort Worth metro area – in 2016, it was the 8th most popular Texas state park with 244,193 visitors. The park is divided into nine units: three are developed (Johnson Branch, Isle du Bois, and the Greenbelt), and six have boat ramps with lake access (Buck Creek, Jordan, Sanger, Pond Creek, Elm Fork, and Pecan Creek).

History
Humans have inhabited the Isle du Bois region for over 11,000 years. Native American tribes such as the Kiowa and the Comanche lived in the area around the 1500s. Settlers arrived in the mid-19th century, driving out most Native Americans. The ruins of a 19th century homestead can be found in the Isle du Bois unit of the park.

Recreation
The park offers nature programs throughout the year. The park has facilities for picnicking, nature study, hiking, biking, fishing, swimming, boating, water skiing, wildlife observation, horse riding, geocaching, and camping.

Also located within the park is the Lake Ray Roberts Marina, a privately operated full-service marina.

Plant and animal life
The park is at the intersection of three ecoregions: Cross Timbers, Blackland Prairie, and Grand Prairie. As a result, it has land featuring the ecosystems of all three regions, including wooded areas and wetlands. Wildlife includes mammals, birds, fish, butterflies, lizards, and snakes.

See also
List of Texas state parks

References

External links
 Official Site

State parks of Texas
Protected areas of Denton County, Texas
Protected areas established in 1993
1993 establishments in Texas